José Luis Estrada Luévanos (born 7 July 1948) is a Mexican retired football league forward and a former Olympian.

Club career
Estrada played the large part of his career for León.

International career
He competed in the 1968 Summer Olympics.

International goals
Scores and results list Mexico's goal tally first.

References

1948 births
Living people
Footballers from Baja California
Association football forwards
Mexican footballers
Mexico international footballers
Pan American Games medalists in football
Pan American Games gold medalists for Mexico
Olympic footballers of Mexico
Footballers at the 1968 Summer Olympics
Club León footballers
Cruz Azul footballers
Liga MX players
Mexican football managers
Footballers at the 1967 Pan American Games
Medalists at the 1967 Pan American Games
20th-century Mexican people